West Branch is an American literary magazine based at Bucknell University and published by the Stadler Center for Poetry. It was established in 1977 and publishes poetry, fiction, creative nonfiction, and literary criticism. TSince 2021, the editor-in-chief is Joe Scapellato. In addition to the print magazine, West Branch also publishes West Branch Wired, an online supplement featuring fiction, poetry, and interviews.

Notable contributors
Kazim Ali
Edith Pearlman
Robert Clark Young
Jacob M. Appel
Cornelius Eady
Terrance Hayes
Ted Kooser
Colette Inez
C. M. Mayo
Dennis Nurkse
Dorothy Barresi
Anne Panning
Elaine Terranova
Chase Twichell
Harry Humes

Honors and awards
Works originally published in West Branch have been subsequently selected for inclusion in The Best American Short Stories, The Best American Poetry, and The Pushcart Prize: The Best of the Small Presses. Randy DeVita's story, "Riding the Doghouse," was reprinted in The Best American Short Stories 2007. Marjorie Hudson's story, "The Clearing" received a Pushcart "special mention" in 2008.

See also 
List of literary magazines

References

External links

Poetry magazines published in the United States
Biannual magazines published in the United States
Bucknell University
Magazines established in 1977
Magazines published in Pennsylvania
Pennsylvania culture